Al-Ayyam may refer to:

Newspapers
 Al-Ayyam (Ramallah)
 Al-Ayyam (Yemen)
 Al-Ayyam (Damascus), main Damascus daily until 1963

Other
 The Days (Arabic: Al-Ayyam), the autobiography of Egyptian writer Taha Hussein

See also
 Al Ayam (disambiguation)